William Francis Kennedy (died 1 January 1874) was a member of the Queensland Legislative Assembly.

Biography
Nothing is known of his early life - He arrived in Queensland in 1841 and pioneered the Tiereyboo run. He was declared insolvent in 1864 and lost Tiereyboo.

Kennedy married Catherine Ann Veronica Cosgrove and together had 3 sons and one daughter. He returned to England and died there in January 1874.

Public career
Kennedy was the member for Maranoa in the Queensland Legislative Assembly from 1863 until the election was declared void in 1864. He was appointed JP of Nebo in Central Queensland from 1867 to 1868.

References

Members of the Queensland Legislative Assembly
1874 deaths